Ahva (Aḥava, lit. Brotherhood) is a village in the northern Negev desert of southern Israel.

The village was established in 1976 for civil servants of the regional council. It is adjacent to the Ahva Academic College and acts as a service center for the surrounding settlements, including Kfar Ahim, Kfar HaRif, Talmei Yehiel and Yenon.

Ahva was  founded on the lands of the depopulated   Palestinian  village of Al-Masmiyya al-Kabira.

References

Villages in Israel
Populated places established in 1974
Populated places in Southern District (Israel)
1974 establishments in Israel